Alexandro-Nevskoye (Sasaplı) is a rural locality (a selo) in Tarumovsky District, Republic of Dagestan, Russia. The population was 1,619 as of 2010. There are 28 streets.

Geography 
Alexandro-Nevskoye is located 25 km south of Tarumovka (the district's administrative centre) by road. Novokrestyanovskoye is the nearest rural locality.

References 

Rural localities in Tarumovsky District